Risto Mattila (born 4 February 1981, Kannus, Central Ostrobothnia) is a Finnish snowboarder.  He is an all-around rider, who has many achievements in half pipe, big air and in park riding contests. He has also made a name by having shots in the international snowboarding magazines. He is well known as a confident rider and because of his smooth style.

Biography 
Mattila was born in Kannus, which is located in Central Ostrobothnia which is well known for its flat surface. Risto started snowboarding at the age of 13 in a small resort called Louekallio, together with Olympic bronze medallist Markku Koski.

Career 
During his snowboard career Risto has obtained many good results, including many wins in FIS world cup and other snowboarding invitational contests.

Mattila participated in the 2002 Winter Olympics in Salt Lake City, finishing 16th in men's halfpipe. He also represented Finland at the 2006 Winter Olympics in Turin, finishing 10th in men's halfpipe.
 
Mattila's 2006–2007 season has started promisingly, and Risto has placed as a second in Air & Style and third in X-Trail Jam, both much respected competitions in the snowboarding world.  Mattila also won the 2007 Nissan X-Trail Big Air in Japan

Most recently Mattila participated in the 2008 Toyota Big Air and placed 2nd to his fellow Flow teammate and friend Antti Autti

Off the snow 
When Risto is not snowboarding he usually spends time in Helsinki with his friends. He likes Finnish candies, good food, ketchup and movies. His hobbies besides snowboarding are skateboarding, breakdance and tennis.

Career Standings 

2001/2002

2nd FIS World Cup overall Half Pipe
2nd FIS Big Air 
16th Salt Lake City Winter Olympics

2003/2004

World Cup overall winner
1st World Cup Big Air
3rd Big Air
1st Leysin Open slope style 
2nd Burton European open slope style
3rd The Arctic challenge Half-pipe

2005/2006

TTR ranking 2nd
4 World cup wins,
Us Open winner, overall and slope style,
Nippon Open pipe 3rd,
Gravity Games Pipe 3rd,
SB-Jam 3 rd overall and the ruler of the kicker,
Arctic Challenge 3rd Big Air,
2nd Freestyle CH Zurich,
2nd Nokia Air & Style 06 Munich

2007/2008

Won 07 Nissan X-Trail Big Air Japan,
2nd Toyota Big Air

Sponsors 
Flow Snowboarding,
Giro,
Volvo,
Billabong,
Dr. Zipe,
Northwave
Drake Bindings and Boards

References

1981 births
Living people
People from Kannus
Finnish male snowboarders
Olympic snowboarders of Finland
Snowboarders at the 2002 Winter Olympics
Snowboarders at the 2006 Winter Olympics
Sportspeople from Central Ostrobothnia